The Oka is a river in Siberia, left tributary of the Angara.

Course  
It originates in the Oka Lake, Oka Plateau, Sayan Mountains at the western end of Buryatia. It flows roughly northwestwards with the Bolshoy Sayan to the southwest. After it bends northeastwards the river flows between the Kropotkin Range and the Belskye Goltsy (Бельские Гольцы). After the Khoyto-Oka tributary joins it from the left it enters Irkutsk Oblast and flows in a roughly more northern direction. Finally the Oka discharges into the Bratsk reservoir.

See also
List of rivers of Russia

References

Rivers of Irkutsk Oblast
Rivers of Buryatia